Guilty (German: Schuldig) is a 1928 German silent drama film directed by Johannes Meyer and starring Suzy Vernon, Bernhard Goetzke and Jenny Hasselqvist.

The film's sets were designed by the art director Walter Reimann.

Cast
 Suzy Vernon as Maria Feld 
 Bernhard Goetzke as Vater Thomas Feld 
 Jenny Hasselqvist as Mutter Magda Feld 
 Willy Fritsch as Lawyer Frank Peters 
 Hans Adalbert Schlettow as Bordellinhaber Peter Cornelius 
 Adolphe Engers as Georg Aschmann 
 Max Maximilian as Clown Bumski 
 Mammey Terja-Basa as Mongole 
 Rudolf Biebrach
 Heinz Salfner
 Arnold Korff
 Lotte Stein

References

Bibliography
 Bock, Hans-Michael & Bergfelder, Tim. The Concise CineGraph. Encyclopedia of German Cinema. Berghahn Books, 2009.

External links

1928 films
1928 drama films
German drama films
Films of the Weimar Republic
German silent feature films
Films directed by Johannes Meyer
German films based on plays
German black-and-white films
UFA GmbH films
Silent drama films
1920s German films
1920s German-language films